Anne Gibson (born 26 October 1968 in Dumfries), married name Anne Robertson, is a Scottish badminton player who represented Great Britain in the 1996 Summer Olympic Games. She was Scottish Women's singles champion from 1989 to 1993, and from 1995 to 1997.

References

External links
 
 
 
 
 
 

1968 births
Living people
Scottish female badminton players
Olympic badminton players of Great Britain
Badminton players at the 1996 Summer Olympics